Major Best Harding (born October 13, 1935) is an attorney and former Chief Justice of the Florida Supreme Court.  He was appointed to the court by Governor Lawton Chiles in 1991 and served until 2002.  His tenure as chief justice lasted from 1998 to June 2000.  Prior to being appointed to the Florida Supreme Court, Harding served as a circuit judge for Florida's Fourth Judicial Circuit and as a Duval County juvenile court judge.

In 2014, Florida State University appointed him to adjudicate the disciplinary hearing of Florida State quarterback Jameis Winston concerning allegations that Winston violated the university's Student Conduct Code.

Harding received his undergraduate and law degrees from Wake Forest University.  He also holds a Master of Laws in Judicial Process from the University of Virginia.

Harding continues to practice law as a shareholder of the Ausley McMullen firm in Tallahassee, Florida.

References

External links
Official Biography from the Florida Supreme Court

Wake Forest University alumni
University of Virginia School of Law alumni
Chief Justices of the Florida Supreme Court
1935 births
Living people
Politicians from Charlotte, North Carolina
People from Jacksonville, Florida
Lawyers from Charlotte, North Carolina
Justices of the Florida Supreme Court